Robert "Bob" Lewis Samuelson (born July 30, 1966) is an American volleyball player who competed in the 1992 Summer Olympics.

He was born in Port Jefferson, New York.

In 1992 he was part of the American team which won the bronze medal in the Olympic tournament. He played all eight matches. Samuelson led the US Team in blocks, and aces, and finished second in total kills behind Steve Timmons, and hitting percentage behind Doug Partie. Chosen with Bryan Ivie to represent the United States on the World Gala Team, consisting of the world's top 12 players as chosen by the coaches.

With an abundance of enthusiasm and energy, Samuelson was frequently the catalyst to rally the team to victory. Being one of the most popular players among his teammates and fans, he and Bryan Ivie became the faces of USA Volleyball.

At the Barcelona Olympics he was the central character in the controversial preliminary round match against Japan which the USA "won" until the result was overturned on appeal.

Samuelson left the US National Team to compete for the Suntory Sunbirds of the Japanese Professional Volleyball League in 1994, where he played for three seasons. Samuelson led the team to the championship in his first season, and was named the league's Most Valuable Player.

Attending high school at Los Angeles basketball powerhouse, Westchester High School, Samuelson competed in only 1 year high school volleyball. He was a starting forward on the 1984 Westchester High School Basketball Team that was runner up in the City 4A championships, losing to Crenshaw High School. He competed in the 1986 Olympic Festival, and was subsequently heavily recruited out of Los Angeles Pierce Junior College after an undefeated season and being named co Player of the Year with LA Pierce setter, Tony Rusen.

After 2 successful seasons at California State University, Northridge, Samuelson attended an open tryout for the US National Team in 1989, and after a 6-month extended tryout, was invited to train with the team permanently.

Samuelson was an international favorite, playing in the 1989 World Cup, 1990 World Championships, 1991 World Cup, and numerous other international tournaments and friendly tours.

Samuelson is a father of triplet boys.

External links
 
 

1966 births
Living people
American men's volleyball players
Volleyball players at the 1992 Summer Olympics
Olympic bronze medalists for the United States in volleyball
Cal State Northridge Matadors men's volleyball players
People from Port Jefferson, New York
Medalists at the 1992 Summer Olympics